State Route 42 (SR 42) is a primary state highway in the U.S. state of Virginia. Running parallel to and west of Interstate 81, SR 42 consists of three sections, with gaps filled by secondary routes in between. Some of SR 42 lies along the old Fincastle Turnpike. Another major piece, from near Clifton Forge to Buffalo Gap, parallels the old Virginia Central Railroad.

Route description

Smyth County
SR 42 begins at State Route 91 at Broadford, where SR 91 turns north to cross Brushy Mountain. SR 42 continues the east-northeasterly path of SR 91 through the valleys formed by the North Fork Holston River, crossing State Route 16 at Black Hill.

Bland County
SR 42 continues past Groseclose Store and Ceres, meeting State Route 623 at Sharon Springs, the source of the North Fork Holston River. A low crossing of the Tennessee Valley Divide at about  takes SR 42 into the valleys formed by Walker Creek. After passing Effna, SR 42 joins U.S. Route 52 as that route comes down from its Big Walker Mountain crossing. SR 42 crosses Interstate 77 as it approaches Bland, and, in Bland, it meets State Route 98 and parts ways with US 52, still heading east-northeast near Walker Creek. SR 42 passes Point Pleasant and Crandon, and meets State Route 738 at Mechanicsburg, before crossing Kimberling Creek, a tributary of Walker Creek, and then entering Giles County.

Giles County

SR 42 continues to follow Walker Creek through Giles County, passing White Gate before ending at State Route 100 at Poplar Hill.

SR 42 formerly turned north on SR 100, following Walker Creek northeast to Staffordsville. There it turned east on current State Route 730 (now connected to SR 100 via SR 750, an old alignment of SR 100), following some smaller brooks and passing over a summit on its way to Eggleston, where it crossed the New River. SR 730 continues through a rather hilly area from Eggleston to its end at U.S. Route 460, from which US 460 follows Sinking Creek past Maybrook to the next piece of SR 42 near Newport.

SR 42 begins again at U.S. Route 460 near Newport. It crosses old US 460 in Newport and begins following Sinking Creek in a general east-northeasterly direction.

Craig County
After entering Craig County, SR 42 passes the communities of Huffman, Simmonsville, and Sinking Creek, the creek with that name ending soon after. It descends through a gap between Sinking Creek Mountain and Johns Creek Mountain and down the slopes of Johns Creek Mountain into the town of New Castle, where it ends again at State Route 311.

SR 42 once continued northeast on State Route 615, part of the way to U.S. Route 220 near Eagle Rock. (The gap was never completely filled, and part of SR 615 was State Route 43.) This route generally parallels Craig Creek, which takes the waters of Meadow Creek from New Castle into the James River at Eagle Rock. From Eagle Rock, which is in Botetourt County, U.S. Route 220 heads north, mostly along the James River, to Cliftondale Park (east of Clifton Forge) in Alleghany County.

Alleghany County
The third—and longest—piece of SR 42 begins where old U.S. Route 60 becomes State Route 269. SR 42 begins by heading north, along with SR 269, to exit 29 of Interstate 64/US 60. There SR 269 ends, while SR 42 heads north-northeasterly, generally following the Cowpasture River past Nicelytown and into Bath County.

Bath County
SR 42 continues near the Cowpasture River past Nimrod Hall to State Route 39 at Millboro Springs. There the ground levels out, and the combined SR 39 and SR 42 continue east, paralleling Mill Creek into Rockbridge County at Panther Gap.

Rockbridge County
SR 39 and SR 42 continue to parallel Mill Creek from Panther Gap into Goshen, where SR 39 splits to the southwest and SR 42 turns northeast, crossing the Calfpasture River. It runs alongside some small creeks on its way to Bells Valley, and continues to follow small creeks into Augusta County.

Augusta County

SR 42 passes through Craigsville, Following the Little Calfpasture River from there past Augusta Springs and Mount Elliott Springs to Chapin.

Once SR 42 passes through Buffalo Gap, the land is flatter, and the road heads cross-country, still in a north-northeasterly direction, past Churchville (where it crosses U.S. Route 250), Stover, Parnassus, Moscow, Mount Solon, and Mossy Creek.

Rockingham County
SR 42 continues through Bridgewater, where State Route 257 joins it from the east, to Dayton. State Route 42 Business follows the old road through Dayton, and SR 257 leaves to the west, while State Route 290 crosses there. Then SR 42 enters the city of Harrisonburg on High Street. It passes straight through Harrisonburg from High Street across U.S. Route 33 (Market Street) onto Virginia Avenue, leaving the city to the north.

SR 42 continues in its north-northeasterly direction from Harrisonburg, passing Edom, Broadway (where it crosses State Route 259), and Timberville (where it weets the west end of State Route 211 and crosses the North Fork Shenandoah River, which also passes through Broadway).

Shenandoah County
At Forestville, SR 42 turns to the northwest until Getz Corner, where it again turns north-northeasterly. It passes Hudson Crossroads, Conicville, Davey Hill, and Columbia Furnace, where it meets State Route 675, formerly part of State Route 59 west into West Virginia. At Columbia Furnace, SR 42 curves to the east, using the old SR 59 past Harmony and Calvary and across Interstate 81 to its end at U.S. Route 11 and State Route 670 in southern Woodstock.

Major intersections

SR 42 Business

State Route 42 Business is a former segment of SR 42 that was converted into a business route that runs through downtown Dayton. It begins westbound at the northern terminus of the SR 42/257 overlap, and turns north onto Main Street less than a block later. One block north of there, the road is briefly joined by SR 701 at Huffman Drive, then carries that concurrency for three more blocks, only for that road to branch off to the north onto College Street (SR 290). The route continues to run along the northwest side of SR 42 until it finally terminates at a poultry farm just north of town.

References

External links

Virginia Highways Project: VA 42

042
State Route 042
State Route 042
State Route 042
State Route 042
State Route 042
State Route 042
State Route 042
State Route 042
State Route 042
State Route 042
State Route 042
Virginia Byways